Aly Coulibaly (born 8 April 1996) is a French footballer who plays for Spanish club Real Balompédica Linense as a midfielder.

Club career
A Tours FC youth graduate, Paris-born Coulibaly joined Bournemouth's development squad on 23 July 2014 on a one-year deal, after impressing on a trial. On 27 August 2015, he switched clubs and countries again by signing for SD Huesca and being assigned to its farm team in Tercera División.

On 4 June 2016 Coulibaly made his professional debut, coming on as a late substitute for goalscorer Tyronne del Pino in a 1–0 Segunda División home win against CD Lugo. On 14 August, he was loaned to Segunda División B club CF Badalona, for one year.

On 31 January 2019, Coulibaly joined CD Calahorra.

Personal life
Coulibaly's brothers Karim, Ibrahim and Mohamed are also professional footballers.

References

External links

1996 births
Living people
French sportspeople of Senegalese descent
Footballers from Paris
French footballers
Association football midfielders
AFC Bournemouth players
Segunda División players
Segunda División B players
Tercera División players
AD Almudévar players
SD Huesca footballers
CF Badalona players
CD Calahorra players
Real Balompédica Linense footballers
Swiss Challenge League players
FC Schaffhausen players
French expatriate footballers
French expatriate sportspeople in England
French expatriate sportspeople in Spain
French expatriate sportspeople in Switzerland
Expatriate footballers in England
Expatriate footballers in Spain
Expatriate footballers in Switzerland